Süstedter Bach is a river of Lower Saxony, Germany. It is one of the source rivers of the Ochtum near Weyhe.

See also
List of rivers of Lower Saxony

Rivers of Lower Saxony
Rivers of Germany